Iselisberg is a village in the canton of Thurgau, Switzerland.

It is located just north of Uesslingen. In 1995, the Uesslingen municipality merged with its neighbor to form a new and larger municipality Uesslingen-Buch.

It used to be a centre of wine production.

References

Villages in Switzerland